GL Virginis, also known as G 12-30, is a star in the constellation of Virgo. It is a faint red dwarf, like more than 70% of the stars located within 10 parsecs of the Solar System; its magnitude visual magnitude is 13.898, making it impossible to see with the naked eye.

Located 21.1 light years away, GL Virginis has a spectral type of M4.5V and an effective temperature of approximately 3110 K. Its luminosity (emitted in the visible section of the electromagnetic spectrum) is only one ten-thousandth compared to the Sun; however, since a significant fraction of its radiation is emitted as invisible infrared light, its bolometric luminosity increases to 0.5% of that of the Sun. Its mass is 12% that of the Sun and its radius is 16% of the Sun. It is a fairly rapid rotator: its rotational velocity is least 17 km/s, which implies that it takes less than half a day to complete a rotation on its axis. The star is emitting a frequent flares, with at least five detected by 2019.

The closest known star system to GL Virginis is Gliese 486, 6.4 light-years away.

References

Virgo (constellation)
M-type main-sequence stars
1156
Virginis, GL
J12185939+1107338